Darya Dadvar (born in Mashhad, Iran) is an Iranian soprano soloist and composer living in Paris, France.

Education
Darya was born in Mashhad in 1971, but she grew up in Tehran in a Gilak family. In 1991, at the age of twenty, she left Iran for France where she studied music. She is a graduate of The National Conservatory in Toulouse, France. She earned her Diplôme d'Etudes Musicales in voice in June 1999, and, subsequently, completed a four-year professional course in the Baroque style at the Conservatory of Toulouse in 2000. Darya also holds a postgraduate Master of Arts degree from School of Fine Arts of Toulouse (Ecole des Beaux-Arts de Toulouse).

Career
Darya has given concert performances in Canada, France, Germany, Iran, Sweden, the United Kingdom and United States of America. In 2002, Darya was a guest performer in Tehran with the Armenian Symphony Orchestra in the role of Tahmineh, in a work composed and directed by Loris Tjeknavorian based on the tragedy of Rostam and Sohrab, one of the most fascinating tales of Ferdowsi's Shahnameh (The Book of Kings). Apart from singing in English, French, German, Italian and Persian, Darya performs in various native languages of Iran, such as Armenian, Azeri, Gilaki, Kurdish and Mazandarani.

See also
 Music of Iran
 List of Iranian musicians
 List of famous Persian women
 Iranian women and Persian music

Notes

External links 

 Darya Dadvar's official website
 
 
 Darya Dadvar on Spotify
 Interviews with Darya Dadvar: Friday 4 March 2005 (BBC Persian) and Saturday 19 May 2007 (BBC Persian).
 Rostam and Sohrab, by Hakim Abol-Qasem Ferdowsi Tousi, translated into English by Helen Zimmern (Iran Chamber Society).

Living people
Iranian sopranos
Operatic sopranos
Singers from Paris
People from Mashhad
Iranian opera singers
Musicians from Tehran
Iranian women singers
Persian-language singers
20th-century opera singers
21st-century opera singers
Iranian emigrants to France
Iranian classical musicians
Iranian expatriates in France
French people of Iranian descent
20th-century French women singers
21st-century French women singers
21st-century Iranian women singers
Year of birth missing (living people)
20th-century French women opera singers
Exiles of the Iranian Revolution in France